"Central Standard Time/Vasil + Bluey" is a split EP between Kansas City, Missouri band The Get Up Kids and Lawrence, Kansas group The Anniversary. The album was released on colored vinyl in 1999 on Vagrant Records. There were seven different pressings of the album, with each pressing on different colored vinyl. Each song was recorded separately, with "Central Standard Time" recorded at Mad Hatter Studios in Silverlake, California in the summer of 1999 while the band was recording their second full-length album Something to Write Home About. "Vasil + Bluey" was recorded at Red House Studios in Eudora, Kansas.

Track listing

Additional releases
The Get Up Kids re-released "Central Standard Time" on their B-Sides collection Eudora. It was also featured as a bonus track on the European version of the band's second album Something to Write Home About.
The Anniversary re-released "Vasil + Bluey" on their B-Sides collection Devil On Our Side: B-Sides & Rarities.

Personnel

The Get Up Kids
Matt Pryor - Vocals, Guitar
Jim Suptic - Guitar, Backing Vocals
Rob Pope - Bass
Ryan Pope - Drums
James Dewees - Keyboards

The Anniversary
Josh Berwanger - Guitar
Justin Roelofs - Guitar
Adrianne Verhoeven - Keyboards
James David - Bass guitar
Christian Jankowski - Drums

Notes

The Get Up Kids EPs
1999 EPs
Split EPs